Epepeotes schlegelii is a species of beetle in the family Cerambycidae. It was described by Lansberge in 1884. It is known from Sumatra.

References

schlegelii
Beetles described in 1884